Lawson B. Knott Jr. (April 6, 1912 – May 23, 1998) was an American administrator who served as Administrator of the General Services Administration from 1964 to 1969.

He died of respiratory failure on May 23, 1998, in Arlington County, Virginia at age 86.

References

1912 births
1998 deaths
Administrators of the General Services Administration
Lyndon B. Johnson administration personnel
Nixon administration personnel